Hijinx Theatre is a professional theatre company with its base at the Wales Millennium Centre in Cardiff, Wales. They are also a touring company, performing at the Glastonbury Festival and Edinburgh Festivals, and tour also small scale theatres throughout the UK and Europe. The cast includes actors with and without learning disabilities.

History

Hijinx Theatre was established in 1981 by Gaynor Lougher and Richard Berry. In 2004, the theatre company moved into the Wales Millennium Centre in Cardiff.

Hijinx Theatre has established five Hijinx Academies, they are the only professional performance training for actors with learning disabilities in Wales. The first Hijinx Academy was established in Cardiff in 2012. There are now two Academies in Cardiff (Hijinx Academy South), one in Prestatyn (Hijinx Academy North), one in Carmarthen at the Lyric Theatre (Hijinx Academy West), and one in Aberystwyth.

References

External links
 Official website

Theatre companies in Wales
Performing groups established in 1981
Arts in Cardiff
Disability theatre